Divide Township, Nebraska may refer to the following places in Nebraska:

 Divide Township, Buffalo County, Nebraska
 Divide Township, Phelps County, Nebraska

Nebraska township disambiguation pages